Lloyd Saltman (born 10 September 1985) is a Scottish professional golfer.

Early life and career
Saltman was born in Edinburgh, Scotland, and is the grandson of former Hibernian goalkeeper Tommy Younger. He had a successful career as an amateur golfer, with wins in several prestigious tournaments including the 2003 Scottish Boys' Championship, 2005 Brabazon Trophy, 2005 St Andrews Links Trophy, 2007 Irish Amateur Open Championship, 2007 Lytham Trophy, and the 2007 Scottish Champion of Champions. In 2005 he finished 15th in The Open Championship at St Andrews, to win the Silver Medal as the low amateur having finished one stroke ahead of Eric Ramsay.

Saltman competed for Great Britain and Ireland in two Walker Cup matches, the first in 2005 and again in 2007. Shortly after his second appearance, he turned professional and attempted to qualify for the European Tour. However he failed to progress to the final stage of the qualifying school and, with limited guaranteed playing opportunities in Europe, decided to try for his card on the Asian Tour. He finished 31st at the Asian Tour School at the end of 2007, to gain a place on the tour. However, because of the reputation he built up as an amateur, Saltman received invitations to many European Tour and Challenge Tour events during 2008, and played in just two tournaments on the Asian Tour, finishing in 17th place on his début in the SAIL Open.

At the end of 2008, Saltman returned to the European Tour's qualifying school, and although he reached the final stage after coming through a seven-man playoff, he missed out on winning a European Tour card meaning he would have another season on the Challenge Tour in 2009.

In July 2009 Saltman and his brother Elliot both qualified for the Open Championship at Turnberry, to become the first brothers to appear together in The Open since 1985, when Seve and Manuel Ballesteros both played. After two years on the European Challenge Tour Saltman gained a full European Tour Card in December 2010 by finishing 11th in the Stage 3 of European Tour Qualifying School. His youngest brother Zack, is also a professional golfer.

Amateur wins
2003 Scottish Boys Strokeplay Championship
2005 Brabazon Trophy, St Andrews Links Trophy
2007 Irish Amateur Open Championship, Lytham Trophy, Scottish Champion of Champions

Professional wins (2)

Tartan Pro Tour wins (1)

Hi5 Pro Tour wins (1)

Results in major championships

Note: Saltman only played in The Open Championship.

LA = Low amateur
CUT = missed the half-way cut
"T" = tied

Team appearances
Amateur
European Boys' Team Championship (representing Scotland): 2003
European Youths' Team Championship (representing Scotland): 2004 (winners), 2006
European Amateur Team Championship (representing Scotland): 2005, 2007
Walker Cup (representing Great Britain & Ireland): 2005, 2007
St Andrews Trophy (representing Great Britain & Ireland): 2006 (winners)
Jacques Léglise Trophy (representing Great Britain & Ireland): 2003 (winners)

See also
2010 European Tour Qualifying School graduates

References

External links 

Scottish male golfers
European Tour golfers
Asian Tour golfers
Golfers from Edinburgh
1985 births
Living people